A clinical data management system or CDMS is a tool used in clinical research to manage the data of a clinical trial. The clinical trial data gathered at the investigator site in the case report form are stored in the CDMS. To reduce the possibility of errors due to human entry, the systems employ various means to verify the data. Systems for clinical data management can be self-contained or part of the functionality of a CTMS. A CTMS with clinical data management functionality can help with the validation of clinical data as well as helps the site employ for other important activities like building patient registries and assist in patient recruitment efforts.

Classification 
The CDMS can be broadly divided into paper-based and electronic data capturing systems.

Paper-based systems 
Case report forms are manually filled at site and mailed to the company for which trial is being performed. The data on forms is transferred to the CDMS tool through data entry. The most popular method being double data entry where two different data entry operators enter the data in the system independently and both the entries are compared by the system. In case the entry of a value conflicts, system alerts and a verification can be done manually. Another method is Single Data Entry.

The data in CDMS are then transferred for the data validation. Also, in these systems during validation the data clarification from sites are done through paper forms, which are printed with the problem description and sent to the investigator site and the site responds by answering on forms and mailing them back.

Electronic data capturing systems 
In such CDMSs, the investigators directly upload the data on CDMS, and the data can then be viewed by the data validation staff. Once the data are uploaded by site, the data validation team can send the electronic alerts to sites if there are any problems. Such systems eliminate paper usage in clinical trial validation of data.

Clinical data management 

Once data have been screened for typographical errors, the data can be validated to check for logical errors. An example is a check of the subject's date of birth to ensure that they are within the inclusion criteria for the study. These errors are raised for review to determine if there are errors in the data or if clarifications from the investigator are required.

Another function that the CDMS can perform is the coding of data. Currently, the coding is generally centered around two areas — adverse event terms and medication names. With the variance on the number of references that can be made for adverse event terms or medication names, standard dictionaries of these terms can be loaded into the CDMS. The data items containing the adverse event terms or medication names can be linked to one of these dictionaries. The system can check the data in the CDMS and compare them to the dictionaries. Items that do not match can be flagged for further checking. Some systems allow for the storage of synonyms to allow the system to match common abbreviations and map them to the correct term. As an example, ASA (acetylsalicylic acid) could be mapped to aspirin, a common notation. Popular adverse event dictionaries are MedDRA and WHOART and popular Medication dictionaries are COSTART and WHO Drug Dictionary.

At the end of the clinical trial the data set in the CDMS is extracted and provided to statisticians for further analysis. The analysed data are compiled into clinical study report and sent to the regulatory authorities for approval.

Most of the drug manufacturing companies are using Web-based systems for capturing, managing and reporting clinical data. This not only helps them in faster and more efficient data capture, but also speeds up the process of drug development.  In such systems, studies can be set up for each drug trial. In-built edit checks help in removing erroneous data. The system can also be connected to other external systems. For example, RAVE can be connected to an IVRS (Interactive Voice Response System) facility to capture data through direct telephonic interviews of patients. Although IRT (Interactive Response Technology) systems (IVRS/IWRS) are most commonly associated to the enrollment of a patient in a study thus the system defining the arm of the treatment that the patient will take and the treatment kit numbers allocated to this arm (if applicable). Besides rather expensive commercial solutions, there are more and more open source clinical data management systems  available on the market. CDMS implementations are required to comply with 21 CFR Part 11 federal regulations to be used for FDA registered drug trials. Part 11 requirements include audit trails, electronic signatures, and overall system validation.

See also 
 Clinical data management
 Clinical Quality Management System
 Clinical trial management system
 Clinical trial
 Electronic data capture
 Electronic Common Technical Document (eCTD)
 Drug development

References 

 Stuart Summerhayes, CDM Regulations Procedures Manual, Blackwell Publishing, 
 Tai BC, Seldrup J., A review of software for data management, design and analysis of clinical trials, Ann Acad Med Singap. 2000 Sep;29(5):576-81.
 Greenes RA, Pappalardo AN, Marble CW, Barnett GO., Design and implementation of a clinical data management system, Comput Biomed Res. 1969 Oct;2(5):469-85.

External links
 CDMS at Mayo Clinic
 Association for Clinical Data Management
 Society for Clinical Data Management
 French network of Data Managers in Academic biomedical research
 Data Quality Research Institute

Clinical research
Clinical data management